Hebeloma atrobrunneum is a species of mushroom in the family Hymenogastraceae. Described as new to science in 1989, it was found on moist soil growing under Willow (Salix spp.) plants in Denmark.

See also
List of Hebeloma species

References

atrobrunneum
Fungi described in 1989
Fungi of Europe